Frank Hembre Nunley (born  October 1, 1945), known by the nickname Fudge Hammer, is a former American football linebacker. He played college football at the University of Michigan from 1964 to 1966 and professional football for the San Francisco 49ers from 1967 to 1976.

Early years
Nunley was born in Lexington, Alabama, in 1945, and attended Belleville High School in Belleville, Michigan.

University of Michigan
Nunley played college football for the University of Michigan from 1964 to 1966. He was selected by the Associated Press as a first-team linebacker on its 1966 All-Big Ten Conference football team. He was inducted into the University of Michigan Athletic Hall of Honor in 1989.

San Francisco 49ers
Nunley was selected by the San Francisco 49ers in the third round (62nd overall pick) of the 1967 NFL Draft. He remained with the 49ers for 10 seasons from 1967 to 1976. Playing at the linebacker position, Nunley became a starter in 1969 and anchored the 49ers defense in the early 1970s that ran an innovative "flex" defense under Dick Nolan. He helped lead the 1970 and 1971 49ers teams to consecutive appearances in the NFL championship games, losing both times to the Dallas Cowboys.

Later years
After retiring from football, Nunley lived in Los Altos, California, and sold electronics for Sanmina-SCA.

References

1945 births
Living people
People from Lauderdale County, Alabama
People from Palo Alto, California
Players of American football from Alabama
American football linebackers
Michigan Wolverines football players
San Francisco 49ers players
Businesspeople from California